Iram J. Weinstein is an engineer at Science Applications International Corp. in McLean, Virginia. He was named a Fellow of the Institute of Electrical and Electronics Engineers (IEEE) in 2014 for his work in signal processing and test methods for radar-detecting advanced aircraft and cruise missiles in severe terrain clutter.

References 

Fellow Members of the IEEE
Living people
21st-century American engineers
Stanford University alumni
Northeastern University alumni
Year of birth missing (living people)